Daman Jan (also Romanized as Dāman Jān) is a village in Abarghan Rural District of the Central District of Sarab County, East Azerbaijan province, Iran. At the 2006 National Census, its population was 1,732 in 328 households. The following census in 2011 counted 1,720 people in 421 households. The latest census in 2016 showed a population of 1,847 people in 486 households; it was the largest village in its rural district.

References 

Sarab County

Populated places in East Azerbaijan Province

Populated places in Sarab County